The Sambuvarayar(Tamil: சம்புவராயர்) chieftains once ruled the Tondaimandalam region of South India. Among them was Edirili Chola Sambhuvaraya, a vassal under Rajadhiraja Chola II and Kulotunga Chola III, who ruled the northern part of Tondaimandalam, now comprising the districts of Vellore, Tiruvannamalai, Kancheepuram, Cuddalore, Tiruvallur, Nellore, and Chittoor. Later during the 14th century when the Telugu Cholas, Hoysala and Pandya kingdoms went into decline, the Sambuvarayas ruled their regions independently. Two chiefs of the family namely, Venrumankonda Sambuvaraya (1322 CE) and Rajanarayana Sambuvaraya (1337 CE), issued records in their own regnal years.

Origin
The Sambuvarayas were chiefs who rose to power under the imperial Cholas. The Sambhuvaraya capital was at Marudaraya Padaveedu, now known as Padavedu in Polur taluk, Tiruvannamalai district, Tamil Nadu. Padaveedu (also spelt Padavedu) is the site of the popular Sri Renukambal Temple.

Rajagambhiram fort
The vassal had constructed a hill fort, Rajagambhiram, at present day Padaveedu, to watch and control the movements of the northern enemies. The fort has four gates in four directions. The northern gate was now called as Shanta gate. The other gates were damaged. While the eastern gate was in a dilapidated condition, the western gate on which was found the inscription has been completely damaged. This gate was named after Puvandai alias Cholakon, one of the soldier in the military service of Edhirili Chola Sambhuvaraya. One hero stone has been erected on the plains, north of the Shanta gate.

This fort once had residences and `pandals' for warriors who were posted for duties. Holes had been made on the rock surface in such a way as to erect round tents. One could see nine tent areas on the top of the hill. Besides, four water tanks had been created to provide drinking water. Two natural water ponds were also available in the fort. Near the big tank a mortar with one foot depth and one foot diameter was dug and used. The area also revealed clear traces of Shiva and Vinayaka temples. Stone blocks, bricks each measuring 10 inches x 7 inches, lime mortar and sand were used in the construction of the fort walls.

Decline 

The Sambuvarayas lost power and went into decline with the rapid expansion of the Vijayanagar empire in the 14th century. Rajanarayana Sambuvaraya allied with the Vijayanagar ruler Harihara I against the Sultanate of Madura but was later killed by Harihara's brother Bukka Raya I who sought to bring most of South India under his rule.

See also
Pallava

References

External links
  Sambuvaraya lineage king Vallalan
 Temple built by Sambuvaraya king

Tamil monarchs